"Sometimes" is a song by British acid jazz group Brand New Heavies, released in March 1997 as the lead single from their fourth album, Shelter (1997). The lead vocal is performed by American singer Siedah Garrett, who also co-wrote it. As one of their most successful songs, it charted at number 11 in the UK and number 88 in the US. It also peaked at number 16 in Scotland, number 20 in Iceland, number 57 in Sweden and number 83 in the Netherlands. The single was certified silver in the UK. The accompanying music video is a spoof of US TV-shows like Playboy's Penthouse and Playboy After Dark, and shows the band with Garrett performing at one of these TV-shows. It also features some small clips of Playboy magnate Hugh Hefner.

Critical reception
Larry Flick from Billboard described "Sometimes" as "a slinky sliver of soul that demands the immediate attention". He complimented Garrett's performance and commented that "besides offering a performance that will give jeep kiddies a swift kick in the pants, she can craft solid hooks that add dimension to the band's acclaimed knack for weaving body-invading funk rhythms." 

A reviewer from Music & Media viewed the song as "hooky" and "refreshingly downbeat". British magazine Music Week gave it four out of five, declaring it as "laid down soul funk from the band that helped create the term acid jazz." The reviewer added, "Now with Siedah Garrett on vocals, they sound as if they're back to form." Ezra Gale from Salon felt that it "starts out with a promising bass and drums vamp, [and] instead turns into an overblown sing-along by the time it reaches the first chorus."

Track listing
 12" single, Italy (1997)
"Sometimes" (Brixton Radio 12" Mix)
"Sometimes" (Brixton Rap Mix) 
"Sometimes" (Ditti's French Touch)

 CD single, UK & Europe (1997)
"Sometimes" (Radio Edit) – 4:04
"Sometimes" (MAW Smooth Mix) – 7:28
"Sometimes" (Ummah Remix) – 4:31
"Sometimes" (Nuyoricans Meet The Heavies) – 5:13

 CD single, US (1997)
"Sometimes" (Radio Edit) – 4:15
"Sometimes" (The Ummah Remix) – 4:30

Charts

Weekly charts

Year-end charts

References

 

1997 singles
1997 songs
FFRR Records singles
Songs written by Siedah Garrett
The Brand New Heavies songs